Chełmiński may refer to: 

Jan Chełmiński (1851–1925), a Polish historical painter

Locality in Poland
 Radzyń Chełmiński, a town in Grudziądz County
 Dorposz Chełmiński, a village in Gmina Chełmno within Chełmno County
 Powiat Chełmiński, the Polish language toponym for the Chełmno County